St Basil's School is a kindergarten to higher secondary school located at Basti, in Uttar Pradesh, India.

The School was established in 1984 in Basti town. It is named after St. Basil, one of the catholic patrons and saints of 3rd century. The school motto is "Lead Kindly Light". The school celebrates its foundation day on 2 January.

The school is associated with the Council for the Indian School Certificate Examinations, which conducts the ICSE (Grade 10) and ISC (Grade 12) examinations over the country.

References

External links
 

Primary schools in Uttar Pradesh
High schools and secondary schools in Uttar Pradesh
Christian schools in Uttar Pradesh
Schools in Basti
Educational institutions established in 1984
1984 establishments in Uttar Pradesh